François Bouchard (born April 26, 1988) is a Canadian professional ice hockey player who is currently an unrestricted free agent. He most recently played for Les Pétroliers du Nord in the Ligue Nord-Américaine de Hockey (LNAH). He is the younger brother of Pierre-Marc Bouchard who also played in the NHL.

Playing career
Bouchard was drafted in the second round, 35th overall in the 2006 NHL Entry Draft by the Washington Capitals. During the 2006–07 QMJHL season, Bouchard led the league in points with 125 for Baie-Comeau Drakkar.

On July 15, 2011, Bouchard signed a one-year contract with the Washington Capitals. In the preceding 2011–12 season, on November 8, 2011, Bouchard was traded to the New York Rangers in exchange for Tomas Kundratek.

On December 18, 2012, Bouchard joined to the KHL Medvescak in Austrian Hockey League (EBEL). On June 7, 2013, Bouchard signed a contract with Swedish team IK Oskarshamn in HockeyAllsvenskan.

Bouchard has since had spells with Södertälje SK, HC Pustertal Wölfe, Boxers de Bordeaux and Dundee Stars.

Career statistics

References

External links

1988 births
Living people
Baie-Comeau Drakkar players
Boxers de Bordeaux players
Canadian ice hockey right wingers
Cincinnati Cyclones (ECHL) players
Connecticut Whale (AHL) players
Dundee Stars players
French Quebecers
Hershey Bears players
Ice hockey people from Quebec
KHL Medveščak Zagreb players
Les Pétroliers du Nord players
IK Oskarshamn players
HC Pustertal Wölfe players
Sportspeople from Sherbrooke
Södertälje SK players
Washington Capitals draft picks
Canadian expatriate ice hockey players in Austria
Canadian expatriate ice hockey players in Scotland
Canadian expatriate ice hockey players in Croatia
Canadian expatriate ice hockey players in Sweden
Canadian expatriate ice hockey players in the United States
Canadian expatriate ice hockey players in Italy